Baby food is any soft easily consumed food other than breastmilk or infant formula that is made specifically for human babies between six months and two years old. The food comes in many varieties and flavors that are purchased ready-made from producers, or it may be table food eaten by the family that has been mashed or otherwise broken down.

Readiness & Health

Readiness
As of 2023, the World Health Organization, UNICEF and many national health agencies recommended waiting until six months of age before starting a child on food. Neither too early nor too late.

Health
As a global public health recommendation, the World Health Organization recommends that infants should be exclusively breastfed for the first six months of life to achieve optimal growth, development and health. Most six-month-old infants are physiologically and developmentally ready for new foods, textures and modes of feeding. Experts advising the World Health Assembly have provided evidence that introducing solids earlier than six months increases babies' chances of illness, without improving growth.

One of the health concerns associated with the introduction of solid foods before six months is iron deficiency. The early introduction of complementary foods may satisfy the hunger of the infant, resulting in less frequent breastfeeding and ultimately less milk production in the mother. Because iron absorption from human milk is depressed when the milk is in contact with other foods in the proximal small bowel, early use of complementary foods may increase the risk of iron depletion and anemia.

In Canada sodium content in infant food is regulated; strained fruit, fruit juice, fruit drink, and cereal cannot be sold if sodium has been added (excluding strained desserts). Foods naturally containing sodium are limited to 0.05 - 0.25 grams per 100 grams of food, depending on the type of infant food.

If there is a family history of allergies, one may wish to introduce only one new food at a time, leaving a few days in between to notice any reactions that would indicate a food allergy or sensitivity. This way, if the child is unable to tolerate a certain food, it can be determined which food is causing the reaction.

Meeting the nutritional needs of infants as they grow is essential for their healthy development. Feeding infants inappropriately or insufficiently can cause major illnesses and affect their physical and mental development. Educational campaigns that share information on when to introduce solid foods, appropriate types of foods to feed an infant, and hygiene practices are effective at improving these feeding practices.

Nutritional needs and the amount of food 
Newborns need a diet of breastmilk or infant formula.  About 40% of the food energy in these milks comes from carbohydrates, mostly from a simple sugar called lactose.

As shown in the 2008 Feeding Infants and Toddlers study, the overall diet of babies and toddlers, the primary consumers of baby food, generally meets or significantly exceeds the recommended amount of macronutrients. Toddlers and preschoolers generally ate too little dietary fiber, and preschoolers generally ate too much saturated fat, although the overall fat intake was lower than recommended.  Micronutrient levels were typically within the recommended levels.  A small group of older infants in the American study needed more iron and zinc, such as from iron-fortified baby foods.  A substantial proportion of toddlers and preschoolers exceeded the upper recommended level of synthetic folate, preformed vitamin A, zinc, and sodium (salt).

The World Health Organization recommends starting in small amounts that gradually increase as the child gets older:  2 to 3 meals per day for infants 6 to 8 months of age and 3 to 4 meals per day for infants 9 to 23 months of age, with 1 or 2 additional snacks as required.

Preparation and feeding

Baby foods are either a soft, liquid paste or an easily chewed food since babies lack developed muscles and teeth to effectively chew. Babies typically move to consuming baby food once nursing or formula is not sufficient for the child's appetite. Babies do not need to have teeth to transition to eating solid foods. Teeth, however, normally do begin to show up at this age.  Care should be taken with certain foods that pose a choking hazard, such as undercooked vegetables, grapes, or food that may contain bones. Babies begin eating liquid style baby food consisting of pureed vegetables and fruits, sometimes mixed with rice cereal and formula, or breastmilk. Then, as the baby is better able to chew, small, soft pieces or lumps may be included. Care should be taken, as babies with teeth have the ability to break off pieces of food but they do not possess the back molars to grind, so food can be carefully mashed or prechewed, or broken into manageable pieces for their baby.  Around 6 months of age, babies may begin to feed themselves (picking up food pieces with hands, using the whole fist, or later the pincer grasp [the thumb and forefinger]) with help from parents.

Homemade or commercial 

Homemade baby food is less expensive than commercial baby foods.  Homemade food is appropriate only when the family has a sufficient and varied diet, as well as access to refrigeration and basic sanitation. It is important to follow proper sanitation methods when preparing homemade baby food such as washing and rinsing vegetables or fruit, as well as the cooking and packaging materials that will be used.

Homemade food requires more preparation time than simply opening a jar or box of ready-to-eat commercial baby food. Food may need to be minced or pureed for young babies, or cooked separately without the salt, intense spices, or sugar that the family chooses to eat.

Picky eating 

Parents and/or caregivers may perceive up to half of toddlers as being "picky" or "faddy", with the peak around 24 months.  Adults who hold this opinion often stop offering new foods to the child after only three to five attempts, rather than continuing to offer the food until the child has tasted it eight to fifteen times.  They may also engage in counterproductive behaviors, such as offering appetite-suppressing milk or other favorite foods as an alternative, or trying to force or bribe the child into eating.

Types
Through the first year, breastmilk or infant formula is the main source of calories and nutrients. From birth to six months, infants should consume only breast milk or an unmodified milk substitute. In their first 3-5 days of life, newborns should be fed 2 oz every 2-3 hours during the day, and every 3 hours at night making up for 8-12 feedings per day. When an infant is four months old, their diet still consists exclusively of milk or formula and typically should be eating 30-32 oz per day. By six months old, infants are ready to be introduced to table food. 

Babies may be started directly on normal family food if attention is given to choking hazards; this is called baby-led weaning. Because breastmilk takes on the flavor of foods eaten by the mother, these foods are especially good choices.

Food type(2008)
Cereals On a typical day about half of American babies aged four and five months old are fed infant cereal.  The baby may have eaten as little as one small bite of infant cereal, or even as little as one small bite of a food that contains infant cereal mixed with other foods.  Other types of grain-based foods are rare at that age.  About 90% of babies aged six to twelve months eat some type of grain, although only half eat infant cereal.  The others eat rice, bread, crackers, pasta, or cereal designed for older children.
Fruits On any given day, about 20% of babies aged four and five months eat some type of fruit, usually a prepared baby food. As with all of these, this may represent as little as one small bite of fruit or a food partly composed of fruit.  Two-thirds of babies aged six to nine months, and between 75% and 85% of babies and toddlers older than nine months, eat some type of fruit.  At age six to nine months, half of the babies are eating prepared baby food fruits, but toddlers aged 12 months and older primarily eat non-baby food fruits, such as fresh bananas or canned fruits.  Apple and bananas are common fruits for babies of all ages.  Fruit juice, primarily apple and grape juice, is usually introduced later than fruit, and about half of older babies and toddlers drink some type of 100% fruit juice.
 Vegetables On a typical day, about a quarter of babies aged four and five months eat some type of vegetable at least once, almost always prepared baby food, and usually a yellow or orange vegetable like carrots, pumpkin, sweet potatoes, and winter squash.  At age six to nine months, about 60% of babies and about 70% of older babies and toddlers eat vegetables, with baby food vegetables rapidly being replaced by cooked vegetables after about nine months.  Raw vegetables are uncommon for all babies and toddlers.  By the first birthday, almost a third of babies eat potatoes on a given day.
Meat Very few four- and five-month-old American babies eat meat or other protein sources (excluding milk).  Six- to nine-month-old babies mostly eat meat as part of baby food that contains a small amount of meat along with vegetables or grains.  About three-quarters of nine- to twelve-month-old babies are given either meat or another protein source, such as eggs, cheese, yogurt, beans, or nuts.  More than 90% of babies aged 12 to 18 months old, and nearly all toddlers older than that, are given a protein source at least once a day.  Almost three-quarters of these toddlers are given non-baby food meat; prepared baby food meat (by itself) is uncommon at any age.
 Sweet and salty foods Sweet and salty foods are uncommon for babies.  Compared to a prior study in 2002, the number of babies under the age of nine months that received any sort of sweetened food, snack, or beverage, had dropped by nearly half.  At age nine to twelve months, fewer than half of babies are given sweetened foods like cookies, ice cream, or fruit-flavored drinks. Prepared baby food desserts are uncommon at any age, but are given to almost 12% of babies aged nine to twelve months.

Toddler foods
Some commercial baby food companies have expanded their lines to produce specialty foods for toddlers from the age of about 12 months to two and a half years old.  These include juice, cereal, small microwaveable meals, baked goods, and other foods that have been formulated and marketed for toddlers.

Geriatric use
In the late 1940s, Gerber Products Company and Beech-Nut produced special cookbooks to promote the sale of commercial baby foods for use by elderly, sick, or disabled people.

Historical and cultural
Baby food varies from culture to culture. In many cultures, pastes of a grain and liquids are the first baby food. In human history and presently with many cultures around the world, babies are fed food premasticated by the caretaker of the baby in order to pulverise the food and start the digestion process. An infant's first bite of solid food is ceremonial and holds religious importance in many cultures. An example of this is annaprashan, a Hindu ritual where the infant is fed a sweetened rice porridge, usually blessed, by an elder family member. Similar rites of passage are practiced across Asia, including the Bengal region, Vietnam, and Thailand.

In the Western world until the mid-1900s, baby food was generally made at home. The industrial revolution saw the beginning of the baby food market which promoted commercial baby foods as convenience items. In developed countries, babies are now often started with commercially produced iron-fortified infant cereals, and then move on to mashed fruits and vegetables. Commercial baby foods are widely available in dry, ready-to-feed and frozen forms, often in small batches (e.g. small jars) for convenience of preparation. On the contrary, in developing countries, breastfeeding is more widely accepted and socially tolerated in public, thus creating a societal contrast. Amy Bentley, author of Inventing Baby Food, talks about how infant feeding reflects one's "position in the postwar era of the American Century" because in developed countries, families are able to purchase processed baby foods to feed their children, whereas in developing country, natural breastfeeding is more popular.

Commercially prepared baby foods in the Netherlands were first prepared by Martinus van der Hagen through his NV Nutricia company in 1901. In United States they were first prepared by Harold Clapp who sold Clapp's Baby Food in the 1920s.   The Fremont Canning Company, now called the Gerber Products Company, started in 1927.  The Beech-Nut company entered the U.S. baby food market in 1931. The first precooked dried baby food was Pablum which was originally made for sick children in the 1930s. Other commercial baby food manufacturers include H. J. Heinz Company, Nestlé, Nutricia, Organix and Unilever.  Heinz produced dehydrated baby food in the 1980s. The demand from parents for organic food began to grow in the 1960s; since then, many larger commercial manufacturers have introduced organic lines of infant food.

At the beginning of the 20th century in America, most babies began eating baby food around the age of seven months.  During and shortly after World War II, the age at which solid food was first introduced dropped to just six weeks.  This age has since increased to four to six months. By the mid-20th century, manufactured baby food was readily used and supplemented previous infant feeding practices. Author of Inventing Baby Food, Amy Bentley argues that the excessive additives of sugar, salt, and MSG in overused manufactured baby food conditioned infants to prefer processed foods later in life. Also, it is believed that exposing infants to solid foods at an earlier age well help them get used to foods later on in life. This subsequent misuse of salt and sugar was also feared to effect issues of weight and nutrition based diseases.

In China and other east Asian countries, homemade baby food remains common, and babies are started on rice porridge called xifan, then move on to mashed fruits, soft vegetables, tofu and fish. In Sweden, it is common to start with mashed fruit, such as bananas, as well as oatmeal and mashed vegetables. In western Africa, maize porridge is often the first solid food given to young children.

Market
According to Zion Market Research, the market size for baby food in the United States is estimated to be $53 billion in 2018 and growing to $76 billion by 2021.

Commercial baby food in the United States is dominated by Gerber, which had about 70% of the American market share in 1996.  Beechnut had about 15% of the market, and Heinz had about 10%.  Heinz's Earth's Best, the largest brand of organic baby food, had about 2% of the American market share.

In Australia, Canada, and New Zealand, Heinz had about 90% of the market share in 1996.  Heinz is also the market leader in the UK, Italy, and several eastern European countries.

Controversies
Some commercial baby foods have been criticized for their contents and cost. Over the decades, there have been multiple recalls of baby foods because of concerns about contamination or spoilage.  In 1984 and 1986, Gerber was involved in a scandal over glass baby food jars breaking in transit, which dramatically affected its sales and profitability, although the US Food and Drug Administration later concluded that the company was not at fault.  In 1987, Beechnut paid US$25 million to resolve charges of selling adulterated apple juice in the early 1980s.  In 2011, Nestlé France decided to recall a batch of P'tit pot baby food as a precautionary measure after a customer reportedly found glass shards in one of their jars. An investigation into the incident's scope led the company to conclude that it had been an isolated occurrence and that the rest of the batch had not been affected.

See also
Breastfeeding
Infant formula
International Code of Marketing of Breast-milk Substitutes
Nestlé boycott
Organic Baby Products

References

External links
 When do I introduce solids?: NHS Choices
 Babies, weaning: NHS Choices
 Solids: the first steps: NHS Choices
 Foods and Drinks for 6 to 24 Month Olds : CDC Choices
 Introducing solid foods: What you need to know  from the Mayo Clinic.
 Feeding Tips  from the Baby Care Encyclopedia.
 The Evolution of the Baby Food Industry 2000-2008, Federal Trade Commission Working Papers, 2009

Infant feeding
Articles containing video clips
Foods by type